Horacio Angel Carbonari (born 2 May 1974) is a Argentine former professional footballer who played as a defender. He was nicknamed "Bazooka" due to his powerful free-kicks.

Career

Rosario Central
Born in Santa Teresa, a town in the southern end of Santa Fe Province, Carbonari began his career at Rosario Central.  His debut at the first division was in 1993. In the Argentinian club, he won the 1995 Copa CONMEBOL and was the competition's joint top scorer with four goals, having scored twice in the second leg of the final against Atlético Mineiro. From 1993 to 1998, Carbonari played a total of 135 Argentine Primera División matches, scoring 26 goals.

England
Carbonari was signed by Derby County in the summer of 1998 for £3 million by former Derby manager Jim Smith. Carbonari was the first Argentinian ever to play in the Premier League alongside Juan Cobián, who was at Sheffield Wednesday. He quickly became a fans favourite and won praise from the fans after scoring twice against rivals Nottingham Forest in the 1998-99 Premier League.

In 2002, while John Gregory was manager, Carbonari became out-of-favour at the club and had a short loan spell at Coventry City, before being released by Derby in the same year. Carbonari played a total of 90 league matches for the Rams, scoring nine times.

Return to Rosario Central and retirement
Carbonari returned to Rosario Central in 2003, where he suffered from knee injuries. He helped the club to qualify for the 2004 Copa Libertadores, where his club lost to São Paulo in the Round of 16 after the penalty shootout, with Carbonari scoring from the spot. He decided to retire in 2005 after a knee injury ended his season.

At the beginning 2006–07 season, he was appointed the general manager of Rosario Central.

Honours
Rosario Central
 Copa Conmebol: 1995

References

External links
 

1974 births
Living people
People from Constitución Department
Sportspeople from Santa Fe Province
Argentine footballers
Association football defenders
Argentine Primera División players
Premier League players
English Football League players
Rosario Central footballers
Derby County F.C. players
Coventry City F.C. players
Argentine football managers
Argentine expatriate footballers
Argentine expatriate sportspeople in England
Expatriate footballers in England